Goldthorn Park is a suburb of Wolverhampton, West Midlands.  It is situated to the south of the city centre within the Blakenhall ward.

It mostly consists of nearly 2,000 private houses built in the 1920s and 1940s. The original plan for the estate included bowling greens, croquet lawns and a golf course, but none of these developments were ever built.

Other parts of the estate were developed in the 1960s and 1970s.

The area is historically located within the Manor of Sedgley and was administered by Sedgley Urban District Council until the government changes of 1966, when it was incorporated into Wolverhampton despite the most of the rest of Sedgley being incorporated into Dudley.

To the west and north it was bordered by Wolverhampton, while on the east it was bordered by Coseley, with the border of Sedgley and Coseley urban district councils running along the main Sedgley-Wolverhampton A459 road.

Goldthorn Park includes the Park Hall Hotel, a popular venue for private functions, which was originally Sedgley Park Hall, home of the Lords of the Manor of Sedgley. Originally a boys school, it was built in about 1705 and was substantially expanded over the years.

Goldthorn Park was increased in size with the building of new estates in the 1960s and 1970s.

Colton Hills Community School, an 11-18 school, has been based on the estate since 1975, replacing the following former schools: Municipal Grammar School which existed in Whitmore Reans,  Penn Secondary Modern School, Manor Road in Penn (demolished and now a housing estate) and Graiseley Secondary School, Graiseley Row, Wolverhampton. When the school opened it was known as Colton Hills Upper School. The first Headmaster was Mr Parsons who was ex-RAF and who held the DFC. (Distinguished Flying Cross). The Deputy Headmaster was Mr Keith Berry. Currently, the headmaster is called Alberto Otero and the school has received a 'good' rating from ofsted.

References

Bibliography
Sedgley Urban District Council Yearbooks, 1953-1958, Sedgley, West Midlands (Formerly Staffordshire).
 Information on age range and location of Colton Hills Comprehensive School
 Wolverhampton's Locally Listed Buildings

Areas of Wolverhampton